Worlds.com, or Worlds Chat, is an online virtual worldbased chat program introduced in April 1995 by the company Worlds Inc. Worlds.com was the first program Worlds Inc. made available to the general public, and it was free of charge to download from their website. The popularity of the program, in addition to prior successful developments associated with Worlds Inc. such as Tamiko Thiel's work with Steven Spielberg to create Starbright World (a virtual world for ill children), allowed the company to procure a minority investment of $5.6 million from Pearson PLC in June 1995.

User interface
A Worlds.com user is allowed to choose from a gallery of existing three-dimensional avatars to be their representation in the virtual world. The gallery is presented in a first-person perspective. Once an avatar is chosen, the user is placed in the central hub of a virtual space station. The user sees representations of other online users in the station. Users can exit a platform through sliding doors, travel through halls, and find other platforms with groups of people to interact with. The interface has a section for software notifications, a window with a 3D interface similar to Doom (video game), a window for chat messages, and a space station map indicating which platform the user is currently inhabiting.

Worlds Chat team
Assembled by Dave Marvit (VP of Production), the original team that constructed Worlds Chat consisted of Andrea Gallagher (producer), Dave Leahy, Syed Asif Hassan, and Bo Adler (development), and Jeff "Scamper" Robinson and Helen Cho (UI and graphics). The original client/server protocol for the multi-user environment was developed by Mitra Ardron, Bo Adler, Judy Challinger, and Dave Leahy (PTO US6219045). Unlike other immersive environments of its day, it worked on lines as slow as 9600 baud. Contributors to the project included David Tolley (music), Wolf Schmidt (documentation), John Navitsky and Scott Benson (operations), Naggi Asmar (quality assurance), and others.

Technical challenges
The first release of VRML, a standard for defining virtual worlds, was less than six months old when Worlds.com was released. This meant that Worlds Inc. needed to discover and define its own best practices while creating Worlds.com. The additional speed of dial-up Internet connections naturally placed limitations on the amount of information that could be transmitted to and from the Worlds Inc. servers. An increasing number of users alongside the expanding virtual world increased these pressures.

In 2011 Tamiko Thiel, the creative director and producer at Worlds Inc. from 1994 to 1996, wrote an article entitled "Cyber-Animism and Augmented Dreams" describing the history of virtual worlds, in which she wrote:
"In the virtual worlds and avatar communities in the mid 1990s we thought we all would start parallel, virtual, online existences in which we could create ourselves anew and realize our personal dream worlds. The technology however was too awkward, the processors and the Internet connections too slow, and the user base for our worlds never extended beyond a small dedicated community. By 2002 the virtual communities of the first generation all went bankrupt or looked for other ways to earn money."

See also
 Virtual world
 Metaverse
 Cyberspace
 Active Worlds
 VRML

References

External links
 Worlds Promo

Internet properties established in 1995
Virtual world communities